Saleem Kidwai OBE is Secretary General of the Muslim Council of Wales, An accountant by profession, in 2014 Kidwai was awarded an Honorary Fellowship by Cardiff Metropolitan University. He was awarded the Order of the British Empire in the 2006 Birthday Honours for "services to Diversity and Business in Wales".

References

Living people
Welsh Muslims
Members of the Order of the British Empire
Year of birth missing (living people)